Luis Alberto Guadalupe (born April 3, 1976 in Chincha) is a retired football Peruvian footballer who played as a central defender

Career 
Guadalupe has played most of his career for the Universitario de Deportes club in Lima, Peru. He has also had spells with Independiente in Argentina, KV Mechelen in Belgium, and Veria FC in Greece.

Guadalupe made 16 appearances for the Peru national football team.

Honours

Club 
Universitario de Deportes
 Torneo Descentralizado (1): 1998
Juan Aurich
 Torneo Descentralizado (1): 2011

References

External links
 
 

1976 births
Living people
People from Ica Region
Peruvian footballers
Peru international footballers
Peruvian Primera División players
Club Universitario de Deportes footballers
Club Atlético Independiente footballers
K.V. Mechelen players
Veria F.C. players
Juan Aurich footballers
León de Huánuco footballers
Real Garcilaso footballers
Club Deportivo Universidad César Vallejo footballers
Peruvian expatriate footballers
Expatriate footballers in Argentina
Expatriate footballers in Belgium
1999 Copa América players
Association football defenders